Acosmeryx beatae is a moth of the  family Sphingidae. It is known from Sulawesi.

References

Acosmeryx
Moths described in 2005
Moths of Indonesia